Tony Douglas (born August 16, 1952, in Point Fortin, Trinidad) is a retired professional football (soccer) forward from Trinidad and Tobago.  He spent his professional career in the United States, playing in the North American Soccer League, American Soccer League and Major Indoor Soccer League.  He earned seven caps, scoring one goal, with the Trinidad and Tobago national football team.

In 1974, Douglas signed with the Los Angeles Aztecs of the North American Soccer League. As the fifth shooter, he converted on the game-winning penalty kick for the Aztecs in the 1974 NASL Championship Final. There was a bit of controversy on the play, as he actually missed on his first attempt; the referee however granted him a re-kick after judging Miami goalkeeper Osvaldo Toriani to have come off his line early. In 1976, the Aztecs traded Douglas to the San Jose Earthquakes in exchange for Laurie Calloway. The Earthquakes then sent him on loan to the Utah Golden Spikers of the American Soccer League.

In 1977, he moved to the ASL's California Sunshine for two seasons, then, in the winter of 1978–79, played for the Cleveland Force of the Major Indoor Soccer League. In 1980, Douglas returned to outdoor soccer (and to Southern California) to play for Maccabi Los Angeles. Douglas played three seasons for Maccabi, leading them to the final of the National Challenge Cup each year from 1980 to 1982, winning the Cup in 1981. When Maccabi folded after the 1982 season, Douglas retired.

Awards
ASL All-Star: 1977

References

External links
 NASL Stats
 Soca Warriors

American Soccer League (1933–1983) players
California Sunshine players
Cleveland Force (original MISL) players
Los Angeles Aztecs players
Major Indoor Soccer League (1978–1992) players
North American Soccer League (1968–1984) players
North American Soccer League (1968–1984) indoor players
San Jose Earthquakes (1974–1988) players
Trinidad and Tobago footballers
Trinidad and Tobago international footballers
Utah Golden Spikers players
1952 births
Living people
Association football forwards
People from Point Fortin
Expatriate soccer players in the United States
Trinidad and Tobago expatriate footballers
Trinidad and Tobago expatriate sportspeople in the United States